Georg Erhard Hamberger (21 December 1697 – 22 July 1755) was a German professor of medicine, surgery, and botany.

Biography
Hamberger was born in Jena, and received his Doctor of Medicine degree from the University of Jena in 1721. He studied the physiology of respiration, especially with respect to breathing. He authored a textbook on physiology, covering the thorax muscles, intercostal muscles, and pleural sac. He also studied the reaction of camphor and nitric acid. His writings included the study of gravitation and the ascension of gases.

References

External links

ADB: Hamberger, Georg Erhard information from WikiSource 
Hamberger, Georg Erhard 1697–1755 publications from WorldCat

1697 births
1755 deaths
Scientists from Jena
People from Saxe-Weimar
18th-century German physicians
German surgeons
German physiologists
18th-century German botanists
18th-century German chemists
University of Jena alumni
Academic staff of the University of Jena